Montonen is a Finnish surname. Notable people with the surname include:

Claus Montonen (born 1946), Finnish theoretical physicist
Jussi Montonen (1924–2015), Finnish diplomat

See also
Montonen–Olive duality

Finnish-language surnames